Jarren Williams is a former American football quarterback. He enrolled at the University of Miami in 2018 but did not see much game action until the 2019 season. Against Louisville on November 9, 2019, he threw six touchdown passes. On October 30, 2019, Williams was named the starter for the remainder of the 2019 season.

Early years
Williams attended Central Gwinnett High School in Lawrenceville, Georgia. As a senior, he threw for over 3,000 yards with 28 touchdowns and four interceptions. He played in the 2018 Army All-American Bowl. He committed to the University of Miami to play college football.

College career
Williams played in one game his first year at Miami in 2018 and redshirted. As a redshirt freshman in 2019, he was named the Hurricanes starting quarterback.

On December 13, 2021, Williams committed to Alabama A&M.

He retired from football in June 2022.

References

External links
Miami Hurricanes bio

Year of birth missing (living people)
Living people
People from Lawrenceville, Georgia
Sportspeople from the Atlanta metropolitan area
Players of American football from Georgia (U.S. state)
American football quarterbacks
Miami Hurricanes football players